Helge Sverre Nesheim (9 December, 1919 – 4 April, 2012) was a Norwegian radio and television host.

Biography
Nesheim was mainly known from the Norwegian Broadcasting Corporation (NRK) children's programs. Around 1960, he was made director of the children and youth department taking over from Lauritz Johnson.  Over the years, Nesheim  collaborated with a number of children's authors including Alf Prøysen and Anne-Cath. Vestly. He was primarily associated with the children's shows Barnetimen for de minste and Lørdagsbarnetimen. In 1960, he made the first Norwegian children's TV show, Kosekroken. Nesheim wrote, translated and edited a number of children's books and collections of popular songs. He also recorded music, and in 1975 released an album titled Titelitue.

References

1919 births
2012 deaths
People from Haugesund
Norwegian radio presenters
Norwegian television presenters
Norwegian women television presenters
Norwegian women radio presenters
NRK people
Norwegian children's writers
Norwegian women children's writers